Chaîne de la Selle is a mountain range in Haiti, on the island of Hispaniola. 

The range's Pic la Selle is the highest point of Haiti, at a height of 2,680 meters (8,793 feet) above sea level.

See also

References

Mountain ranges of Haiti